Talles Frederico Souza Silva (born August 20, 1991) is a Brazilian high jumper. A member of Brazil's track and field squad at the 2015 IAAF World Championships, the 2015 Pan American Games, and the 2016 Summer Olympics, he cleared an automatic qualifying height of 2.29 m as his personal best at the regional grand prix meet in Campinas less than five months before his nation hosted the Games.

At the 2016 Summer Olympics in Rio de Janeiro, Silva competed as a lone countryman for the host nation Brazil in the men's high jump. Leading up to his maiden Games, Silva jumped a height of 2.29 metres to attain both his personal best and the IAAF Olympic entry standard in Campinas. During the qualifying phase, Silva elected to pass 2.17 at his first attempt, but he could not trump the 2.20-metre barrier with all three misses, ending his campaign quickly in a six-way tie with the other five high jumpers for thirty-fifth place.

Competition record

References

@talesfsilva
 

Living people
1991 births
Sportspeople from Minas Gerais
Brazilian male high jumpers
World Athletics Championships athletes for Brazil
Pan American Games athletes for Brazil
Athletes (track and field) at the 2015 Pan American Games
Athletes (track and field) at the 2016 Summer Olympics
Olympic athletes of Brazil
Athletes (track and field) at the 2018 South American Games
21st-century Brazilian people